Douglas John Hodgson (born 27 February 1969) is an Australian former professional soccer player who played as a defender.

References

External links

Doug Hodgson career stats at the Post-War Player Database

1969 births
Living people
Australian soccer players
Association football defenders
Sheffield United F.C. players
Plymouth Argyle F.C. players
Burnley F.C. players
Oldham Athletic A.F.C. players
Northampton Town F.C. players
English Football League players